Thomas Flanginis (Italian: Tommaso Flangini; 1578–1648) was a wealthy Greek lawyer and merchant in Venice, who founded the Flanginian School, a Greek college where many teachers were trained. The ‘Flanginian School’ established by Thomas Flanginis remained a renowned establishment for several centuries.

His father Apostolos Thomas was originally from the island of Corfu while his mother Maria Flangini was from the island of Cyprus.

See also
Greek community in Venice
Greek scholars in the Renaissance

References

1578 births
1648 deaths
Greek Renaissance humanists
Italian people of Greek descent
Greek Cypriot people
16th-century Greek people
17th-century Greek people
People from Corfu
Greek Cypriot writers
Cypriot academics
16th-century Greek educators
17th-century Greek educators
Republic of Venice people